Joseph Michael Castanon (born August 19, 1997), better known by his stage name Sir Castanon, is an American actor and singer-songwriter. He was also known for his role as Ben Newman in the comedy Click (2006)

Acting
He has appeared in several television series, including Jericho, NCIS, I Hate My 30's, Crossing Jordan, Without A Trace, October Road, ER, a mini series Comanche Moon, and won the 2006 Young Artist Award for Guest Starring Young Actor in a TV series for an appearance on Ghost Whisperer. That same year, he made his feature film debut playing Ben Newman, son of Adam Sandler's character in the comedy Click.

Music career
Castanon became serious about music after he booked the starring role in the West Coast Ensemble stage production of "Big the Musical" in the fall of 2008. It was then he realized his love for performing in front of live audiences. He joined forces and began writing and recording with multi-award winning writer and producer Jonathan George. The two-year journey of development and work spawned the artist Sir Castanon. He released his debut album, "Puppeteer", on iTunes and CD Baby on December 28, 2010.

References

External links

1997 births
American male child actors
American male film actors
American male television actors
Living people
Male actors from Denver
21st-century American male actors